The Rouse Ball Professorship of Mathematics is one of the senior chairs in the Mathematics Departments at the University of Cambridge and the University of Oxford. The two positions were founded in 1927 by a bequest from the mathematician W. W. Rouse Ball. At Cambridge, this bequest was made with the "hope (but not making it in any way a condition) that it might be found practicable for such Professor or Reader to include in his or her lectures and treatment historical and philosophical aspects of the subject."

List of Rouse Ball Professors at Cambridge
 1928–1950 John Edensor Littlewood
 1950–1958 Abram Samoilovitch Besicovitch 
 1958–1969 Harold Davenport
 1971–1993 John G. Thompson
 1994–1997 Nigel Hitchin
 1998– William Timothy Gowers

List of Rouse Ball Professors at Oxford
The chair at Oxford was established with a £25,000 bequest and was initially advertised by the University as a Chair in Mathematical Physics. The Rouse Ball Professor is now hosted at the university's Mathematical Institute.
 1928–1950 E. A. Milne
 1952–1972 Charles Coulson
 1973–1999 Roger Penrose, Emeritus Rouse Ball Professor of Mathematics 
 1999–2020 Philip Candelas, Emeritus Rouse Ball Professor of Mathematics
 2020–     Luis Fernando Alday, presently Rouse Ball Professor of Mathematics

See also

 Rouse Ball Professor of English Law

References

Mathematics, Rouse Ball
Mathematics, Rouse Ball
Faculty of Mathematics, University of Cambridge
Mathematics, Rouse Ball
1927 establishments in England
Mathematics education in the United Kingdom
Lists of people associated with the University of Oxford
  
Rouse Ball Professors of Mathematics (University of Oxford)